Pope John Paul II is a 2005 television miniseries dramatizing the life of Pope John Paul II (Karol Józef Wojtyła) from his early adult years in Poland to his death at age 84.

The miniseries was written and directed by John Kent Harrison and aired in the United States on the CBS network on 4 and 7 December 2005. It was first released in Vatican City on 17 November 2005 and ten days later throughout Italy on Rai 1

Jon Voight portrays an older Karol Wojtyła (after his investiture as pope in 1978), while Cary Elwes portrays Wojtyła in his earlier life from 1939 to 1978. Voight was nominated for an Emmy Award for his performance.

Pope John Paul II co-stars James Cromwell as Archbishop Adam Stefan Cardinal Sapieha, Ben Gazzara as Agostino Cardinal Casaroli, and Christopher Lee as Stefan Cardinal Wyszyński. Polish actor Mikolaj Grabowski is seen twice playing Joseph Cardinal Ratzinger of Germany, who would succeed John Paul II as Pope Benedict XVI.

Plot 
Part 1: (4 December 2005)

The miniseries opens in 1981 with the Pope John Paul II assassination attempt, then flashes back to the young Karol "Lolek" Wojtyla who survives World War II by working in Kraków's Zakrzowek quarry and Solvay's chemical plant while secretly embracing the illicit Theatre of Poland to keep Polish culture alive. Wojtyla accepts a calling to study for the priesthood and joins an underground seminary, involving himself in the Polish Resistance movement. In 1945, the war ends with the Soviet occupation and eventual takeover of Poland. In 1946, Wojtyla is ordained a priest while the Communists hunt down and eliminate anybody with any ties to the Home Army and/or Polish government in exile during the war. Wojtyla travels to Rome for his graduate studies and returns to Poland in 1948 for his first pastoral assignment in Niegowic. In 1949, he is transferred St. Florian's church in Krakow, where he also is a counselor to students at Jagiellonian University. In 1956, Wojtyla is appointed ethics professor at the Catholic University of Lublin. In 1958, the Holy See appoints him Kraków's auxiliary bishop—Poland's youngest bishop ever and in 1959, he ends the decade by holding Nowa Huta's first Mass outdoors on Christmas Eve in the Communists' newly completed "city without God".

After leading an unusual procession of the Black Madonna's empty picture frame through Krakow, Wojtyla attends all four Vatican II sessions, where he impresses many influential foreign cardinals with his charisma, multilingualism and viewpoints, both before and during his term as Kraków's archbishop. After becoming a cardinal in 1967 by Pope Paul VI, Wojtyla returns to Poland as Karol Cardinal Wojtyla, and miraculously cures a bone marrow cancer victim by praying to Padre Pio. Paul VI dies in 1978 and Papal conclave, August 1978 convenes, electing Albino Cardinal Luciani as Pope John Paul I, who himself dies only 33 days later. The cardinals then reconvene with Papal conclave, October 1978 and Wojtyla is told by Wyszynski to accept the position if he is elected—for Poland's sake.

Part 2: (7 December 2005)

Opening on October 16, 1978 with deadlocked balloting, Wojtyla wins the papal election as the first non-Italian pope since Adrian VI in 1522, naming himself John Paul II. In his Papal inauguration speech, he says "be not afraid", causing Soviet leaders to decide that Wojtyla is "no friend of Marxism". Afterwards, he performs papal mediation in the Beagle conflict between Argentina and Chile. In 1979, he receives Soviet foreign minister Andrei Gromyko at the Vatican, writes his first papal encyclical—Redemptor hominis—and visits Mexico where he is seen by millions. He then visits Poland with audiences also in the millions and afterwards the United States. He supports Polish Solidarity and receives Lech Walesa at the Vatican. The 1981 assassination attempt occurs. After his recovery, Pope John Paul II appoints Cardinal Ratzinger Prefect of the Congregation for the Doctrine of the Faith, after which he is visited by U.S. President Ronald Reagan in 1982 and in December 1983, visits his failed assassin, Mehmet Ali Agca inside Rebibbia prison to personally forgive him. In December 1984, he appoints Joaquin Navarro-Valls director of the Holy See Press Office, announces World Youth Day in 1985 and witnesses the downfall of East bloc Communism in 1989.

During the 1990s, Pope John Paul II fails to stop the Invasion of Kuwait and the following Gulf War. He responds to the abortion debate with his Letter to Women encyclical. His book, Crossing the Threshold of Hope, becomes a best-seller. John Paul II suffers from increasing symptoms of Parkinson's disease but he keeps a busy schedule. In response to his own suffering, he writes his Evangelium Vitae encyclical as opposition to a worldwide culture of death. He tries to improve Christian–Jewish reconciliation and Holy See–Israel relations. In 2000, he starts the third millennium by apologizing for the Church's sins committed during its history, watches the 9-11 attacks in 2001 with horror and in 2002, addresses American cardinals about the "appalling" Catholic sex abuse scandal. His last public appearance is shown, then his death is announced, with a voice-over of his last requests and a montage of earlier events amid the closing credits and main film score.

Cast 

 Jon Voight as Pope John Paul II
 Cary Elwes as Young Karol Wojtyła
 Ben Gazzara as Agostino Cardinal Casaroli
 Christopher Lee as Stefan Cardinal Wyszyński
 Vittoria Belvedere as Ewa
 James Cromwell as Adam Stefan Cardinal Sapieha
 Daniele Pecci as Roman
 Ettore Bassi as Gapa
 Chiara Conti as Anna
 Valeria Cavalli as Teresa
 Marcin Kuźmiński as Michał
 Giulietta Revel as Halina
 Robert Gonera as Tadeusz
 Krzysztof Pieczyński as Czerny
 Christopher Good as Franz Cardinal König
 Fabrizio Bucci as Krzysztof Zachuta
 Giuliano Gemma as Dr. Joaquín Navarro-Valls
 Wenanty Nosul as Stanisław Dziwisz
 Jan Niklas as Young Dziwisz
 Harald Posch as Hans Frank
 Mikołaj Grabowski as Joseph Cardinal Ratzinger
 Jacek Lenartowicz as Lech Wałęsa
 Massimiliano Ubaldi as Mehmet Ali Ağca
 Andrzej Blumenfeld as Edward Gierek
 Ryszard Radwanski as Gomulka
 Giacomo Piperno as Cardinal Felici
 Paolo Paolini as Jean-Marie Cardinal Villot
 Nicola Pistoia as Maximilien Cardinal de Fürstenberg
 Giulio Base as Pope Paul VI
 Zygmunt Józefczak as Bishop Eugeniusz Baziak
 Michele Gammino as Leonid Brezhnev
 Ewa Zytkiewicz as Andrei Gromyko
 Fabrizio Jovine as Yuri Andropov
 Andrzej Szopa as Mikhail Gorbachev
 Marc Fiorini as Giorgio La Pira

External links 

Pope John Paul II Official Site
Pope John Paul II DVD Ignatius Press Website
 
 Pope John Paul II, Filmpolski.pl

Films about Pope John Paul II
2000s American television miniseries
Films set in Poland
Films set in Kraków
Films shot in Poland
Films set in Vatican City
Films shot in Kraków
2005 television films
2005 films
CBS network films
Cultural depictions of Pope Benedict XVI
Cultural depictions of Leonid Brezhnev
Cultural depictions of Lech Wałęsa
Films directed by John Kent Harrison